The 1954 Southern Jaguars football team was an American football team that represented Southern University in the 1954 college football season. In their 19th season under head coach Ace Mumford, the Jaguars compiled a 10–1 record (5–1 against SWAC opponents), finished second in the SWAC, and outscored all opponents by a total of 374 to 124. The team played its home games at University Stadium in Baton Rouge, Louisiana.

The team was recognized as the black college national co-champion.

Schedule

References

Southern
Southern Jaguars football seasons
Black college football national champions
Southern Jaguars football